The year 1513 in science and technology included a number of events, some of which are listed here.

Exploration and cartography
 March 27 – Juan Ponce de León becomes the first European definitely known to sight the modern-day territory of the United States, specifically Florida, mistaking it for another island. His expedition lands on April 2.
 May – Portuguese explorer Jorge Álvares lands on Lintin Island in the Pearl River estuary.
 September 26 – Vasco Núñez de Balboa, "silent upon a peak in Darién", first sees what will become known as the Pacific Ocean.
 Portuguese land on Ambon Island.
 Piri Reis map compiled.
 Publication in Oppenheim of Johannes Stöffler's treatise on the construction and use of astrolabes, .

Physiology and medicine
 Eucharius Rösslin publishes , an obstetrics manual primarily for midwives written in German which will be widely translated and circulated in Europe.

Births
 Jacques Daléchamps, French physician and botanist (died 1588)

Deaths
 Ibn Ghazi al-Miknasi, Moroccan scholar and mathematician (born 1437)
 Hua Sui, Chinese pioneer of metal movable type printing (born 1439)

References

 
16th century in science
1510s in science